The 2020–21 season was Wigan Athletic Football Club's 89th season in existence and their first back in League One since 2017–18. In addition to the domestic league, Wigan Athletic participated in this season's editions of the FA Cup, EFL Cup, and EFL Trophy.

First-team squad

Statistics

Appearances & Goals 

|-
!colspan=14|Players who have left the club:''

|}

Goals record

Disciplinary record

Transfers

Transfers in

Loans in

Transfers out

Loans out

Pre-season and friendlies

Competitions

Overview

EFL League One

League table

Results summary

Results by round

Matches
The 2020/21 season fixtures were released on 21 August.

FA Cup

The draw for the first round was made on Monday 26, October.

EFL Cup

The first round draw was made on 18 August, live on Sky Sports, by Paul Merson.

EFL Trophy

The regional group stage draw was confirmed on 18 August.

Notes

References

External links

Wigan Athletic F.C. seasons
Wigan Athletic F.C.